Gotzon Martín Sanz (born 15 February 1996) is a Spanish cyclist, who currently rides for UCI ProTeam .

Major results
2020
 1st  Mountains classification, Vuelta a Burgos
 5th Giro dell'Appennino
2021 
 5th Memorial Marco Pantani
 6th Overall CRO Race
 8th Vuelta a Murcia
2022
 8th Overall Vuelta a Asturias
 10th Japan Cup
2023
 1st  Mountains classification, Vuelta a Andalucía
 6th Classic Loire Atlantique
 7th Clàssica Comunitat Valenciana 1969

Grand Tour general classification results timeline

References

External links

1996 births
Living people
Cyclists from the Basque Country (autonomous community)
Sportspeople from Biscay
People from Arratia-Nerbioi